Josep Forgas was a Spanish footballer who played as a forward. The dates of his birth and death are unknown. He spent all 15 seasons of his playing career with CF Badalona, thus being a historical member of the club and part of the so-called one-club men group.

Biography
He was one of the most important footballers in the amateur beginnings of Badalona, for whom he scored 142 goals in 247 caps. He also played several matches for the Catalan national team during the 1920s and 1930s, however, due to the little statistical rigor that the newspapers had at that time, the exact amount of caps he earned is unknown. Together with Paulino Alcántara, Josep Samitier and Ricardo Zamora, he was part of the great Catalan side of the twenties that won the last edition of the Prince of Asturias Cup, an inter-regional competition organized by the RFEF. The tournament consisted of a two-legged tie against Asturias for the right to keep the trophy, and after a 2–0 win at Gijón, Forgas netted a brace in a 4–3 win at Barcelona, thus contributing decisively in helping Catalonia to win a record-breaking third Prince of Asturias Cup title. With these two goals, he was the top scorer of the tournament alongside Ramón Herrera and teammate Domingo Broto, who also scored two goals.

Honours

International
Catalonia
Prince of Asturias Cup:
Champion (1): 1926

References

Year of birth missing
Year of death missing
Sportspeople from Girona
Footballers from Catalonia
Spanish footballers
Association football forwards
CF Badalona players
Catalonia international footballers